Deportivo Pioneros de Cancún F.C. is a football team based in Cancún, México that plays in the Liga Premier Serie B.

History 

The club was founded on May 3, 1984, and in the same year joined the Tercera División de México. It won its first cup after defeating Los Conejos, at the Estadio Víctor Manuel Reyna in the city of Tuxtla Gutiérrez, Chiapas. The following year, the club finished in third place and played in a promotional playoff with the Lobos and Aguilas B clubs. As a result, the club was promoted to the Segunda B. Still, the owner decided to purchase a franchise in the Segunda A, which allowed the club the chance to be promoted to the Primera División de México.

When playing in the Segunda A, the club failed its attempts to be promoted, and in the early 1990s, the city reduced resources, and the club once again fell into the lower divisions. In the mid-1990s, the club changed its name to Tucanes de Cancun but failed to gain popularity and was forced to change the name back to its original name Pioneros. It was not until 2006 when José del Carmen Vázquez Ávila bought the club and proposed a plan to have the franchise in the first division within a couple of years that the club regained local support.

Vázquez's project was truncated in 2007, when Atlante F.C., then a First Division team, moved from Mexico City to Cancun, which led to Pioneros becoming the second team in the city. Finally, in 2009, the franchise was sold to a new team called Guerreros de Acapulco. Pioneros maintained its Third Division team, and in the 2010-11 season, an alliance was formed with Atlante to form a development team called Pioneros Potros.

In August 2012, Pioneros were revived as a participating franchise in the Liga de Nuevos Talentos. During the 2013-14 season, Pioneros won the Apertura 2013 tournament, and as a result, the team reached the Final de Ascenso (Promotion Playoff).

On May 24, 2014, Pioneros defeated Selva Cañera, and the team achieved its promotion to the Liga Premier de Ascenso, the league in which the club currently competes. In January 2015, Pioneros moved to a new stadium and began playing at the Estadio Andrés Quintana Roo, with the Estadio Cancún 86 becoming its alternative ground.

The Pioneros under-13 team participated in the 2019 CONCACAF Under-13 Champions League held in Costa Rica.

In July 2022 Pioneros de Cancún became the reserves squad of Cancún F.C. because the Cancun City Council decided to hand over the administration of the team to the company that owns Cancun F.C.

Kit
 Home kit: Red and white vertical stripes shirt, red shorts and socks.
 Away kit: White with red neck and shoulders, white shorts and socks.

 First kit evolution

Players

Current squad

Honors

 Segunda División de México 1985
 Liga de Nuevos Talentos Apertura 2013
 Ascenso to LP 2013–14

References

External links 
 Official Site
 
 

Football clubs in Quintana Roo
Association football clubs established in 1984
1984 establishments in Mexico
Sports teams in Cancún
Liga Premier de México